Cariati is a town and comune in the province of Cosenza in the Calabria region of southern Italy. Cariati is divided into two parts: Cariati Superiore, situated on top of a hill, and Cariati Marina, which is stretched along the Ionian coastline.

Notable people
Princess Polissena Ruffo was born in Cariati in 1400.

Cariati is also the birthplace of Italian footballer Domenico Berardi.

Antonio Fuoco, a professional racing driver, was also born in Cariati.

References

Cities and towns in Calabria